Virender Kashyap is an Indian politician, belonging to Bharatiya Janata Party. In the 2009 election he was elected to the Lok Sabha from the Shimla constituency in Himachal Pradesh.

He was again elected as an MP from Shimla constituency in Himachal Pradesh in Indian General Election 2014.

References

External links
Official biographical sketch in Parliament of India website

India MPs 2009–2014
Living people
People from Shimla
Lok Sabha members from Himachal Pradesh
India MPs 2014–2019
Bharatiya Janata Party politicians from Himachal Pradesh
1950 births